Heliconius ismenius, the Ismenius tiger or tiger heliconian, is a butterfly of the family Nymphalidae found in Central America and northern South America. They are abundant as far south as Ecuador and Venezuela and as far north as southern Mexico, Guatemala and Belize. H. ismenius are more commonly called the tiger-striped long wing butterfly.  H. ismenius nickname is derived from its long wing structure as well as the beautiful burnt orange and black stripes. Pierre André Latreille, a French zoologist, described Heliconius ismenius in 1817. H. ismenius resembles a number of other butterflies, an example of Müllerian mimicry.

Life and characteristics

Like any other butterfly, Heliconius ismenius start as eggs, grow to a larval, caterpillar stage, pupate and then mature into butterflies. The eggs are spread out under separate leaves with the mother only placing one or two eggs in a specific location of the host plant. The eggs are small and yellow approximately 1.3 mm (height) x 0.8 mm (width). As the larvae mature, they become larger, approximately 2 cm in size, and become colored. They have an orange head and anal plate and a white body with black spots all over. According to Beltran, the pupae were observed to have a strong bowed thorax with five pairs of black spine in the abdomen. As well, the pupae are brown in color and contain an average of three gold colored spots on the pupae dorsum. As a grown butterfly the antenna have short black spines all around as well as the short horns on the head.

Heliconius ismenius are known for feeding on specific plants. The plant a specific H. ismenius stays on throughout its lifetime is called a host plant. The host plants popular for H. ismenius are found in subgenera Distephana and genera Granadilla. They feed on Passiflora platyloba, P. ambigua, P. alata, and P. pedata in Costa Rica only.

Throughout the rainforests they are found no higher than 1,500 meters. During the night, it is common that the adults form groups 3 to 10 meters above the ground. These groups are normally located along the forest edges on branches and tendrils of the host plants and trees.

Member of a Müllerian mimicry ring
H. ismenius shares the appearance of a number of other similar looking butterflies, of both the same genus and other genera (Melinaea, Tithorea) as a member of the "tiger" Müllerian mimicry ring. Various butterfly species that share the trait of being toxic and unpalatable have evolved to share the same aposematic  tiger stripe pattern to mutually advertise this protective trait, thereby increasing its recognition among predators.

Subspecies 
Listed alphabetically:
 H. i. boulleti Neustetter, 1928
 H. i. clarescens Butler, 1875 – tiger-striped longwing
 H. i. fasciatus Godman & Salvin
 H. i. ismenius Latreille, 1817
 H. i. metaphorus Weymer, 1883
 H. i. occidentalis Neustetter, 1928
 H. i. telchinia Doubleday, 1847 – tiger-striped longwing
 H. i. tilletti Brown & Fernández, 1976

Gallery

References 

ismenius
Butterflies described in 1817
Nymphalidae of South America